Al-Thumama Stadium is a football stadium in Al Thumama, Qatar. It is a venue for the 2022 FIFA World Cup in Qatar.

The stadium is located about 20 km south of Doha.

Construction
The Al Thumama Stadium is one of eight stadiums, which have been built, renovated, or reconstructed for the FIFA World Cup in Qatar in 2022. It is located near Hamad International Airport. A joint venture between Al Jaber Engineering of Qatar and Tekfen Construction of Turkey is significantly involved in the construction work. The architectural design, by the Chief Architect of Arab Engineering Bureau Ibrahim Jaidah, takes its inspiration from the traditional taqiyah hat, a traditional cap which is worn by men and boys across the Middle East. A  public park will surround the stadium. The stadium has a capacity of 40,000 seats. Following the World Cup, half of the stadium's seats will be removed and will be donated to other countries. It opened on 22 October 2021.

The construction of Al Thumama Stadium has, along with other stadiums built in anticipation of the 2022 FIFA World Cup, been condemned by multiple human rights organizations including Amnesty International. In October 2019, the Qatari government announced reforms that established a nondiscriminatory minimum wage for all migrant workers in the country and allowed them to change or leave their jobs without employer consent. However, other elements of the system that can leave employers with some control over their workers appeared to remain . FIFA, as the governing body of the World Cup, took charge of matters relating to workers’ rights in the host nation and, upon being asked to comment, the organization wrote: “FIFA and its trusted partner, the Supreme Committee for Delivery and Legacy, have a zero-tolerance policy to any form of discrimination and to wage abuse. Through our work to protect the rights of FIFA World Cup workers in Qatar, FIFA and the Supreme Committee are aware of the importance of wage protection measures in the country and this is why we have put in place robust systems to prevent and mitigate wage abuse on FIFA World Cup sites, as well as mechanisms for workers to raise potential grievances and practices to provide for remediation where companies fail to live up to our standards”.

History 

The inauguration of the stadium took place on October 22, 2021, on the occasion of the Emir Cup Final.

In May 2018, the Al-Thumama Stadium was awarded the MIPIM/Architectural Review Future Project Award in the Sports and Stadiums category.

The stadium hosted six matches of the 2021 FIFA Arab Cup tournament, including a semi-final match between hosts Qatar and Algeria.

Recent tournament results

2021 FIFA Arab Cup

2022 FIFA World Cup

Al Thumama Stadium hosted eight matches during the 2022 FIFA World Cup.

References

External links

Al Thumama Stadium Project

Thumama Stadium
2021 establishments in Qatar
Sports venues completed in 2021